Phelipara is a genus of beetles in the family Cerambycidae, containing the following species:

subgenus Balteophelipara
 Phelipara balteata Aurivillius, 1913
 Phelipara flavovittata Breuning, 1964

subgenus Laophelipara
 Phelipara laosensis Breuning, 1964

subgenus Phelipara
 Phelipara affinis Breuning, 1940
 Phelipara assamana Breuning, 1967
 Phelipara clarior Breuning, 1973
 Phelipara confusa Schwarzer, 1931
 Phelipara estanleyi Vives, 2009
 Phelipara indica (Breuning, 1940)
 Phelipara lineata (Schwarzer, 1930)
 Phelipara marmorata Pascoe, 1866
 Phelipara mindanaonis (Breuning, 1980)
 Phelipara mindorana Vives, 2009
 Phelipara minor Breuning, 1940
 Phelipara moringae (Aurivillius, 1925)
 Phelipara nebulosa (Aurivillius, 1922)
 Phelipara pseudomarmorata Breuning, 1968
 Phelipara sabahensis Hüdepohl, 1995
 Phelipara saigonensis Breuning, 1943
 Phelipara submarmorata Breuning, 1960
 Phelipara subvittata Blair, 1933

References

Agapanthiini